The Division of Honour (since 2013 known as Liga A) is the highest level of women's volleyball in Belgium.

Teams
The following clubs are competing in the 2020-21 season:

Jaraco Ladies Volley Limburg As/Tongeren is the merger of former Liga A teams Datovoc Tongeren and Jaraco As.

Previous winners

Source

Titles by club

See also
Belgium Men's Volleyball League

References

External links
Association Interprovinciale Francophone de Volleyball 
  Belgian Liga A. women.volleybox.net  
Vlaamse Volleybalbond  

Belgium
Division of Honour
Belgium
Professional sports leagues in Belgium